Ricardo Chará Lerma (born 24 May 1990) is a Colombian footballer who plays as a defender, and who is currently a free agent.

Club career

Early career
Chara started his youth career with his hometown club Cali. He then made his first team debut for Centauros Villavicencio in the Categoría Primera B.

Udinese
In summer 2008, he was signed by Deportes Quindío. He then scouted by Udinese. As the club run out of non-EU registration quota, as signed Alexis and Odion Ighalo. Along with new signing Dušan Basta, they were signed by another Italian club, then re-signed them in order to borrow the quota.

Chara left for Cagliari on a 1-year loan from Quindío on 1 September 2008. In January 2009, Chara left "on loan" from Cagliari to Udinese and played at Udinese Primavera under-20 team. In summer 2009, along with Basta, they were signed permanently.

On 14 January 2010, he played his first match for Udinese. He substituted Simone Pepe in the 87th minute, on a Coppa Italia Round of 16 match. The match Udinese won Lumezzane of Italian Lega Pro Prima Divisione (third division) 2–0.

On 31 August 2010, Udinese signed Gabriele Angella along with Diego Fabbrini in co-ownership deal for €3 million. As part of the deal, Chará and Flavio Lazzari joined Empoli, also in co-ownership deal for a peppercorn in 3-year contract.

In June 2012 Udinese reacquired Chará.

International career
At youth level, Chará has been capped for Colombia at the 2005 South American Under-15 Football Championship (4 games 1 brace), at the 2007 South American Under-17 Football Championship (8 games, 1 goal), at the 2007 FIFA U-17 World Cup (4 games), and at the 2009 South American Youth Championship (2 games 1 goal).

References

External links
 
 Profile at Udinese Calcio
 Profile at La Gazzetta dello Sport  
 

1990 births
Living people
Footballers from Cali
Colombian footballers
Colombia under-20 international footballers
Colombian expatriate footballers
Serie B players
Centauros Villavicencio footballers
Cagliari Calcio players
Udinese Calcio players
Empoli F.C. players
Expatriate footballers in Italy
Association football defenders
Colombian expatriate sportspeople in Italy
Pan American Games competitors for Colombia